Daniel Mandroiu (born 20 October 1998) is an Irish professional footballer who plays as an attacking midfielder for EFL League One club Lincoln City.

Club career

Early career
Mandroiu started his football career with Ballymun United moving to St. Kevins’s Boys very early on. St. Kevin's Boys are located in the North Dublin suburb of Whitehall. St. Kevin's had previously produced a number of Republic of Ireland internationals, including Liam Brady, Damien Duff, and Jeff Hendrick. At the age of 15, Mandroiu was signed by Premier League outfit Brighton & Hove Albion. In the 2018–19 season, he made 11 league appearances for Simon Rusk's Under-23 side in the Premier League 2 Division 2, contributing towards the team's promotion to the top flight of under-23 football. The midfielder fired three goals in those matches, while also finding the back of the net in the EFL Trophy against Oxford United at the Kassam Stadium.

Bohemians
On 3 December 2018, Brighton announced that Mandroiu had been released and had signed for League of Ireland Premier Division outfit Bohemians. He made his debut for "the Gypsies" on 15 February 2019 in a 1–0 home victory over Finn Harps. His first goal for the club came a week later, when he found the net away to UCD in a 2–0 win. Further goals would come against Derry City and St Patrick's Athletic, with Mandroiu earning numerous plaudits for his performances. He was nominated for the SWAI Player of the Month award for both April and May, but lost out to Bohemians teammate James Talbot and Dundalk's Sean Gannon respectively. Such was his fine form in his debut season, that Bohemians announced on 19 May that the young midfielder had been given a new contract at the club.

On 14 June, Mandroiu scored two goals in a 2–1 Dublin Derby win over rivals Shamrock Rovers, including a game-winning strike from 30 yards out. This was followed up with an SWAI Player of the Month award for June 2019. Mandriou would go on to win PFAI Young Player of the Year, beating off fellow nominees David Parkhouse and Republic of Ireland international Jack Byrne, while he was also named in the PFAI Team of the Year. July 2020 saw Mandroiu linked with a move to Eredivisie side FC Twente but the move did not come to fruition.

Shamrock Rovers
Mandroiu signed for Bohemians' arch-rivals Shamrock Rovers in December 2020. In June 2021, it emerged that Shamrock Rovers were ordered by the FAI to pay Bohemians a €20,000 compensation fee following a dispute over his transfer.

Lincoln City
On 7 July 2022, Mandroiu joined EFL League One club Lincoln City for an undisclosed fee. He would make his long awaited debut on 1 October 2022 against Bolton Wanderers. His first goal for the club came against Newcastle United U21 in the EFL Trophy.

International career
Also eligible to play for the Romania national team as his father is originally from Romania, Mandroiu has represented the Republic of Ireland at under-16, under-19, and under-21 levels.

He earned his first cap with the under-21s in a European Championship qualifier at home to Luxembourg, coming on as an 86th-minute replacement for Connor Ronan. The Republic of Ireland would win the game 3–0 in what was manager Stephen Kenny's first game in charge. Following this, Mandroiu was not included in Kenny's squad for the Toulon Tournament.

In September 2019, Mandroiu was selected by Kenny for Ireland's squad in upcoming qualifiers against Armenia and Sweden. He came on as a substitute against Armenia and started against Sweden, with Ireland beating Armenia 1–0 at home and Sweden 3–1 away. He was subsequently called into the squad for the October qualifying clashes against Italy and Iceland, although he remained benched for the entire match against the young Italians.

On 24 May 2021, Mandroiu received his first call up to the Republic of Ireland senior squad for the summer friendlies against Andorra and Hungary, but remained an unused substitute in both.

Career statistics

Club

Honours

Club
Shamrock Rovers
League of Ireland Premier Division: 2021, 2022
President of Ireland's Cup: 2022

Individual
PFAI Young Player of the Year: 2019
PFAI Team of the Year: 2019
League of Ireland Player of the Month: June 2019, October 2021

References

External links 

Danny Mandroiu at Football Association of Ireland (FAI)

1998 births
Living people
Association football midfielders
Irish people of Romanian descent
Association footballers from Dublin (city)
Republic of Ireland association footballers
Republic of Ireland expatriate association footballers
Republic of Ireland under-21 international footballers
Association footballers from County Dublin
Brighton & Hove Albion F.C. players
Bohemian F.C. players
Shamrock Rovers F.C. players
Lincoln City F.C. players
English Football League players
St. Kevin's Boys F.C. players